The 1947 NAFC Championship was the first association football championship for the North American Football Confederation (NAFC).

The first tournament came soon after the founding of the NAFC. Cuba hosted the tournament which included the host national team, Mexico and the United States. Rather than forming a team for the competition, the United States Football Soccer Federation chose to send Ponta Delgada S.C., an amateur team from Fall River, Massachusetts. Ponta Delgada had won both the National Challenge Cup and National Amateur Cup, but was unable to compete with Mexico and Cuba. Mexico easily handled both the U.S. and Cuba, defeating the first 5–0 and the second 3–1. Cuba took second place with a 5–2 victory over the United States. All matches were held at La Tropical Stadium.

Venues

Results

Mexico: Raúl Landeros, Alberto Medina, Sergio Bravo, Alfonso Montemayor (captain); Rodrígo Ruíz, Salvador Arizmendi, Antonio Flores, Julián Durán, Adalberto López, Angel Segura, Carlos Septién

United States: Walter Romanowicz, Joe Machado, Manuel Martin, Joseph Rego-Costa, Joe Ferreira, Jesse Braga, Frank Moniz, Ed Souza, Ed Valentine, John Souza, John Travis

Mexico: Raúl Landeros, Alberto Medina, Sergio Bravo, Alfonso Montemayor (captain), Rodrígo Ruíz, Salvador Arizmendi, Javier de la Torre, Max Prieto, Adalberto López, Angel Segura, Carlos Septién

Cuba: Juan Ayra, Jacinto Barquín, Enrique Martinez, José Ovide, José Minsal, Francisco Alvarez, Roure, Antonio Mederos, Antonio Villalón, Manuel Briso, Buxadera.

Cuba: Juan Ayra, Jacinto Barquín, Enrique Martinez, José Ovide, José Minsal, Francisco Alvarez, Santiago Veiga, Antonio Mederos, Antonio Villalón, Luis Gironella, Buxadera

United States: Walter Romanowicz, Joe Machado, Manuel Martin, Joseph Rego-Costa, Joseph Michaels, Jesse Braga, Frank Muniz, Ed Souza, Ed Valentine, John Souza, John Travis

Scorers
Four goals
  Adalberto López

Two goals
  Angel Segura
  Antonio Villalón

One goal
  Carlos Septién
  Rodrigo Ruíz
  Ed Souza
  Ed Valentine

References

External links
 Tournament results

1947
International association football competitions hosted by Cuba
Ponta Delgada S.C.
1947 in Cuban sport
1947–48 in American soccer
1947–48 in Mexican football
1947 in North American sport